Olivier Lenglet (born 20 February 1960) is a French fencer. He won a gold medal in the team épée at the 1988 Summer Olympics and a silver in the same event at the 1984 Summer Olympics.

References

External links
 

1960 births
Living people
French male épée fencers
Olympic fencers of France
Fencers at the 1984 Summer Olympics
Fencers at the 1988 Summer Olympics
Fencers at the 1992 Summer Olympics
Olympic gold medalists for France
Olympic silver medalists for France
Olympic medalists in fencing
People from Saint-Quentin, Aisne
Medalists at the 1984 Summer Olympics
Medalists at the 1988 Summer Olympics
Universiade medalists in fencing
Universiade silver medalists for France
Medalists at the 1981 Summer Universiade
Sportspeople from Aisne
20th-century French people